The Diocese of Northeast America is an ecclesiastical territory or diocese of the Malankara Orthodox Syrian Church. The diocese has jurisdiction over eastern parts of the United States and eastern parts of Canada. The diocese is headquartered at Muttontown, New York.

History
The diocese of Northeast America came into existence in 2009 by dividing the then existed American Diocese.

Timeline
 1970's Many parishes and congregations of the Malankara Orthodox Syrian Church were started in America.
 1976   The parishes in America were placed under the authority of Bombay Diocese.
 1979   A new diocese for America is formed and H.G. Dr. Thomas Mar Makarios was appointed as the first metropolitan of the diocese.
 1991   The Malankara Metropolitan was the ruling hierarch of the American Diocese with Mathews Mar Barnabas as Auxiliary.
 1993   Mathews Mar Barnabas enthroned as the metropolitan of the diocese.
 2002   Zachariah Mar Nicholovos appointed as Auxiliary Metropolitan to Mathews Mar Barnabas.
 2009   The Diocese of America divided into Malankara Orthodox Diocese of Northeast America and Malankara Orthodox Diocese of Southwest America. Mathews Mar Barnabas and Zachariah Mar Nicholovos continued in the diocese of Northeast America.
 2011  Mathews Mar Barnabas retired and Zachariah Mar Nicholovos enthroned as the metropolitan of the diocese.

Diocesan Metropolitan

List of parishes
 St. Mary's Orthodox Church, Bronx, New York
 St. Gregorios Orthodox Church, Queens, New York
 St. Stephen's Orthodox Church, Long Island, New York
 St. Mary's Indian Orthodox Church of Rockland, Suffern, New York
 St. Paul's Indian Orthodox Church, Albany, New York
 St. Baselios Orthodox Church, Elmont, New York
 St. Gregorios Malankara Orthodox Church, Floral Park, New York
 St. Basil Orthodox Church, Franklin Square, New York
 Holy Cross Indian Orthodox Mission Congregation, New York
 St. Gregorios Orthodox Church, Yonkers, New York
 St. George Orthodox Church Of Westchester, New York
 St. Gregorios Orthodox Church Of Westchester, Yonkers, New York
 St. Thomas Orthodox Congregation, Syracuse, New York
 St. George Malankara Orthodox Church Fairless Hills, Pennsylvania (PA)
 St. Mary's Malankara Orthodox Syrian Cathredral,  Philadelphia, Pennsylvania
 St. Gregorios Malankara Orthodox Church, Philadelphia, Pennsylvania
 St. Thomas Indian Orthodox Church, Philadelphia, Pennsylvania
 St. Mary's Orthodox Church, Devereaux Avenue, Philadelphia, Pennsylvania
 St. John's Indian Orthodox Church Of Delaware Valley, Drexel Hill, Pennsylvania
 St. Gregorios Indian Orthodox Church Of Dutchess Country, New York
 St. Peter's & St. Paul's Indian Orthodox Church, Orangeburg, New York
 St. George Malankara Orthodox Church Of India, Staten Island, New York
 Mar Gregorios Orthodox Church, Staten Island, New York
 St. Mary's Orthodox Church, Staten Island, New York
 St. Thomas Malankara Orthodox Church, Port Matilda, Pennsylvania
 St. Mary's Indian Orthodox Church, West Sayville, New York
 St. Mary's Malankara Orthodox Church, White Plains, New York
 St. Thomas Indian Orthodox Church, Yonkers, New York
 St. Gregorios Indian Orthodox church, Parkhill Avenue, Yonkers, New York
 St. Mary's Orthodox Church, Woodside, New York
 St. Mary's Orthodox Church, West Nyack, New York
 St. Thomas Diocesan Chapel, Syosset, New York
 St. Thomas Orthodox Church, Rochester, New York
 St. Baselios Orthodox Church, Ridgewood, New York
 St. John's Malankara Orthodox Church, Orangeburg, New York
 St. Mary's Orthodox Church, Brooklyn, New York
 St. Mary's Orthodox Church, Jackson Heights, New York
 St. Thomas Orthodox Church, Long Island, New York
 St. Mary's Indian Orthodox Church, Valley Cottage, New York
 St. Thomas Indian Orthodox Church, Mt. Olive, New Jersey
 Saints Basilios - Gregorios Orthodox Church, North Plainfield, New Jersey
 St. Stephen's Orthodox Church, Midland Park, New Jersey
 St. Gregorios Indian Orthodox Church, Clifton, New Jersey
 St. George Malankara Orthodox Church, Teaneck, New Jersey
 St. Mary's Orthodox Church of Linden, New Jersey
 St. Thomas Indian Orthodox Church, Baltimore, Maryland
 St. Mary's Indian Orthodox Church of Boston, Maynard, Massachusetts
 St. Thomas Orthodox Syrian Church, Damascus, Maryland
 St. Gregorios Indian Orthodox Church, Silver Spring, Maryland
 St. Thomas Indian Orthodox Church, Hartford, Connecticut
 St. Mary's Indian Orthodox Church, Clifton, Virginia
 St. Thomas Indian Orthodox Church, Greater Washington, 
 St. Gregorios Orthodox Church of Toronto, Canada
 St. Thomas Orthodox Syrian Church, Toronto, Ontario, Canada
 St. Gregorios Indian Orthodox Church, Mississaugua, Ontario, Canada
 St. Mary's Malankara Orthodox Syrian Church, Greater Toronto, Canada
 St. George Orthodox Congregation, Kingston, Ontario, Canada
 St. Thomas Orthodox Church, Brossard, Canada
 St. Thomas Malankara Orthodox Church, Mascher St, Philadelphia, Pennsylvania

Notes

External links
 Website of Diocese of North East America 
 Website of the Malankara Orthodox Syrian Church

Indian-American culture
Malankara Orthodox Syrian Church dioceses
Oriental Orthodoxy in North America
Oriental Orthodox dioceses in the United States
Oriental Orthodox dioceses in Canada
2009 establishments in North America